Epilobium glaberrimum is a species of willowherb known by the common name glaucous willowherb. This clumping perennial wildflower is native to western North America from central Canada to northern Mexico. It generally grows at some elevation in moist places. This plant is somewhat variable in appearance. It may exceed half a meter in height and has hairless foliage with leaves between one and 8 centimeters long. The flower has four notched petals in purple, pink, or white which may be only a couple of millimeters long to over a centimeter long each. The fruit is a narrow, sticklike capsule 2 to 7 centimeters long.

Two subspecies are recognized as valid:
 Epilobium glaberrimum ssp. fastigiatum (Nutt.) Hoch & P.H.Raven
 Epilobium glaberrimum ssp. glaberrimum

External links

Jepson Manual Treatment
Photo gallery

glaberrimum